Sadîc is a commune in Cantemir District, Moldova. It is composed of two villages, Sadîc and Taraclia.

References

Communes of Cantemir District